The 1985 National Panasonic Women's Classic was a women's tennis tournament played on outdoor grass courts at the Milton Tennis Centre in Brisbane, Australia that was part of the Category 3 tier of the 1985 Virginia Slims World Championship Series. It was the sixth, and final, edition of the tournament and was held from 11 through 17 November 1985. First-seeded Martina Navratilova won the singles title and earned $26,000 first-prize money.

Finals

Singles
 Martina Navratilova defeated  Pam Shriver 6–3, 7–5
 It was Navratilova's 10th singles title of the year and the 109th of her career.

Doubles
 Martina Navratilova /  Pam Shriver defeated  Claudia Kohde-Kilsch /  Helena Suková 6–4, 6–7(6–8), 6–1

References

External links
 ITF tournament edition details
 Tournament draws

National Panasonic Open
National Panasonic Open
Pan
National Panasonic Classic
National Panasonic Women's Classic 1985